Miša Mihajlo Kravcev (born 16 February 1962) is a Serbian painter and author from Belgrade.

Work
Kravcev has had a number of joint and author's exhibitions in Serbia and abroad, including in the Cultural Center of Belgrade and gallery Đura Jakšić, Skadarlija, and the Grand Gallery of the Central Military Club. He participated with an exhibit in Stockholm 1998 within the "Capital of European Culture" festival.

As a writer, Kravcev has published three titles, The Angel of Coincidence, Saga of the Red Star, and A Lions's Spring.

Gallery

References 

1962 births
Living people
21st-century Serbian painters
21st-century Serbian male artists
Writers from Belgrade
20th-century Serbian painters
Serbian male painters
20th-century Serbian male artists